Union Township is one of nine townships in Whitley County, Indiana, United States. As of the 2010 census, its population was 2,244 and it contained 884 housing units.

Geography
The stream of Emerick Branch runs through this township.

Cities and towns
 Columbia City (east edge)

Unincorporated towns
 Coesse at 
 Coesse Corners at 
(This list is based on USGS data and may include former settlements.)

Adjacent townships
 Smith Township (north)
 Lake Township, Allen County (east)
 Aboite Township, Allen County (southeast)
 Jefferson Township (south)
 Washington Township (southwest)
 Columbia Township (west)
 Thorncreek Township (northwest)

Cemeteries
The township contains two cemeteries, Union Township Cemetery (NE corner of US 30 and 500 E) and Lutheran Cemetery on Lincoln Way just east of 600 E.

Major highways
  U.S. Route 30
  Indiana State Road 205

Airports and landing strips
 Gordon Airport

References
 U.S. Board on Geographic Names (GNIS)
 United States Census Bureau cartographic boundary files

External links
 Indiana Township Association
 United Township Association of Indiana

Townships in Whitley County, Indiana
Townships in Indiana